The Beloved Adventuress is a lost 1917 silent film drama directed by William A. Brady, George Cowl and Edmund Lawrence. It stars Kitty Gordon and was scripted by Frances Marion. It was distributed by World Film Company.

Cast
Kitty Gordon - Juliette La Monde
Jack Drumier - Robert Nicholson
Inez Shannon - Mrs. Nicholson
Madge Evans - Francin, age 7
Lillian Cook - Francine, age 17
Robert Forsyth - Dr. Stewart
Edward Elkas - Jan Moritz
Robert Paton Gibbs - Critic (*as R. Paton Gibbs)
Frederick Truesdell - Morgan Grant
William Sherwood - Philip Stewart
Pinna Nesbit - Martha Grant
Katharine Johnston - Amy Barker

References

External links

1917 films
American silent feature films
Lost American films
World Film Company films
American black-and-white films
Silent American drama films
1917 drama films
1917 lost films
Lost drama films
1910s American films